AL 73 may refer to:
Alabama State Route 73
Sharpe Field (FAA LID: AL73)